This is a list of current and former Roman Catholic churches in the Roman Catholic Diocese of Orange in California, which includes most of Orange County. The diocese is organized into seven deaneries of seven to twelve parishes or worship centers each.

Deanery 1

Deanery 2

Deanery 3

Deanery 4

Deanery 5

Deanery 6

Deanery 7

Other communities

Former churches
 Our Lady of Lourdes, Santa Ana - Absorbed by Our Lady of La Vang in 2006
 St. Callistus, Garden Grove - Parish was redesignated Christ Cathedral after the purchase of the former Crystal Cathedral; the former St. Callistus campus was sold to and used by the former Crystal Cathedral Ministries until 2018.
 St. Isidore, Los Alamitos - Parish established in 1921, moved to new church in Los Alamitos in 1926. Suppressed 1960 in favor of St. Hedwig's. Re-opened for services in 1962, closed 1999 due to earthquake retrofit costs.

References

 
Orange